In mathematics, Malmquist's theorem, is the name of any of the three theorems proved by . These theorems restrict the forms of first order algebraic differential equations which have transcendental meromorphic or algebroid solutions.

Statement of the theorems
Theorem (1913). If the differential equation

where R(z,w) is a rational function, has a transcendental meromorphic solution, then R is a polynomial of degree at most 2 with respect to w; in other words the differential equation is a Riccati equation, or linear.

Theorem (1920). If an irreducible differential equation

where F is a polynomial, has a transcendental meromorphic solution, then the equation has no movable singularities. Moreover, it can be algebraically reduced either to a Riccati equation or to

where P is a polynomial of degree 3 with respect to w.

Theorem (1941). If an irreducible differential equation

where F is a polynomial, has a transcendental algebroid solution, then it can be algebraically reduced to an equation that has no movable singularities.

A modern account of theorems 1913, 1920 is given in the paper of A. Eremenko(1982)

References

Ordinary differential equations
Theorems in analysis